Tešan Podrugović (Kazanci, Gacko, Herzegovina, Ottoman Empire 1775 — Sremski Karlovci, Austrian Empire 1815) was Serbian merchant, hayduk, storyteller and gusle player who participated in the First Serbian Uprising and Second Serbian Uprising. He was one of the most important sources for Serbian epic poetry recorded by Vuk Karadžić. Podrugović did not sing but used to 'speak' his poems; he understood and felt the poems and thought about what he said. He was Serbia's best known fiddle player (guslar) after Filip Višnjić.

Podrugović's family was from the village of Kazanci in the municipality of Gacko.

Songs 

Vuk Karadžić recorded for the first time many songs sung by Podrugović. The poem about Musa Kesedžija, named Marko Kraljević and Musa Kesedžija, recited by Podrugović was recorded for the first time in Sremski Karlovci in 1815 by Vuk Karadžić. The song about General Vuča was also recorded by Karadžić, based on the singing of Podrugović.

See also
Dimitrije Karaman
Filip Višnjić
Živana Antonijević
Old Rashko
Petar Perunović
Djuro Milutinović the Blind
Marko Utvić
Blind Jeca (Jelisaveta Marković, called "Blind Jeca," was Živana's pupil)
Stepanija
Milia

References 

1775 births
1815 deaths
Serbian guslars
Bosnia and Herzegovina poets
Serbian male poets
Serbs of Bosnia and Herzegovina
18th-century Serbian people
19th-century Serbian people